The Steadfast Tin Soldier is a ballet choreographed by George Balanchine to Bizet's Jeux d'enfants, based on Hans Christian Andersen's 1838 fairytale of the same name of the love between a tin soldier and a paper-doll ballerina. The ballet premiered on July 30, 1975, at the Saratoga Performing Arts Center, with New York City Ballet's Patricia McBride and Peter Schaufuss.

Production
George Balanchine first used Bizet's Jeux d'enfants for a 1955 project, in collaboration with choreographers Barbara Milberg and Francisco Moncion, danced by Melissa Hayden and Roy Tobias. It was revived four years later, with the choreography only credited to Balanchine.

The 1975 version, a pas de deux, was commissioned by the Saratoga Performing Arts Center, where the New York City Ballet performs annually, and premiered on Bizet's centennial year, performed by Patricia McBride and Peter Schaufuss. The ballet uses sets and costumes designed by David Mitchell. After he made The Steadfast Tin Soldier, Balanchine, who had adapted Andersen fairytales before, said what attracted him to fairytales by Andersen was the "underlying Christian substructure". The 1975 ballet premiered in New York City the following year.

In 2020, in response to the impacts of the coronavirus pandemic on the performing arts, the New York City Ballet released a 2014 video recording of The Steadfast Tin Soldier, featuring Erica Pereira and Daniel Ulbricht.

References

External links
Episode 33: Hear the Dance: The Steadfast Tin Soldier on City Ballet The Podcast

1975 ballet premieres
Ballets by George Balanchine
Works based on The Steadfast Tin Soldier
Ballets to the music of Georges Bizet
New York City Ballet repertory
Sentient toys in fiction
Fictional amputees